Andreia Martins Faria (born 19 April 2000) is a Portuguese footballer who plays for Benfica and Portugal as a midfielder.

International goals

Honours 
Benfica
 Campeonato Nacional Feminino: 2020–21, 2021–22
 Campeonato Nacional II Divisão Feminino: 2018–19
 Taça de Portugal: 2018–19
 Taça da Liga: 2019–20, 2020–21
 Supertaça de Portugal: 2019, 2022

References

External links 
Twitter

2000 births
Living people
Portuguese women's footballers
Women's association football midfielders
S.L. Benfica (women) footballers
Campeonato Nacional de Futebol Feminino players
Portugal women's international footballers
UEFA Women's Euro 2022 players